Sir Valentine Knightley (c. 1555 – 9 December 1618) was an English landowner and Member of Parliament.

He was the eldest son of Sir Richard Knightley of Fawsley Hall, Northamptonshire and educated at Hart Hall, Oxford (1568), where he was awarded MA in 1605 and trained for the law at Gray's Inn (1583). He was knighted on 11 May 1603 and succeeded his father in 1615.

He was elected to Parliament as MP for Tavistock in both 1584 and 1586, for Northampton in 1593 and for Tavistock again in 1597. He was knight of the shire (MP) for Northamptonshire in 1604, having also been elected for Dunwich. The latter seat was taken instead by his friend Thomas Smythe.

He served as a Justice of the Peace (J.P.) for Northamptonshire at various times and as a judge of assize in the oyer and terminer courts on the Oxford circuit from 1609 to his death and on the Midland circuit from 1616 to his death. He was a Member of the Virginia Company in 1611 and the North West Passage Company in 1612. He was appointed High Sheriff of Berkshire for 1617–18 and was a deputy lieutenant for Northamptonshire by 1618.

He died a rich man soon after his father in 1618 and was buried at Fawsley. He had married Anne, the daughter of Sir Edward Unton of Wadley, Berkshire, with whom he had a son (who predeceased him) and three daughters. The Fawsley estate passed to his nephew Richard, also an MP for Northamptonshire.

References

 

 
 

1618 deaths
English knights
Knights Bachelor 
English MPs 1584–1585
English MPs 1586–1587
English MPs 1593
English MPs 1597–1598
English MPs 1604–1611
Members of the Parliament of England for Tavistock
High Sheriffs of Berkshire
Year of birth uncertain
People from West Northamptonshire District
People from Faringdon